Norfolk Island Postal Service was responsible for the providing stamps, receipt and delivery of mail to and from Norfolk Island under the Postal Services Act 1983.

The service began in 1947 when the island assumed full control over postal services.

The first stamps from Norfolk Island were issued in 1947 (Scott 1-12), and the last one on June 7, 2016.

There were two operating units of the Postal Service:

 Norfolk Island Philatelic Bureau
 Norfolk Post
As of 1 July 2016, Norfolk Island became a regional council of the Australian State of New South Wales thus, ceasing having its own postal service and postage stamps.

Australian stamps are now valid on the island, and Australia Post will issue separate stamps with a “Norfolk Island, Australia” inscription, similar to its stamps for the Australian Antarctic Territory, Christmas Island and Cocos (Keeling) Islands.

References

External links
 Norfolk Island Philatelic Bureau
 Norfolk Post

Postal organizations
Postal system of Australia